David Edward McGurn (born 14 September 1980) is a Scottish footballer who plays as a goalkeeper for Scottish League Two club Cowdenbeath. McGurn previously played for Greenock Morton, Raith Rovers and Stranraer.

Career
McGurn was born in Glasgow. He began his senior Greenock Morton career in 2003 when he was signed by John McCormack from Hillwood Boys Club. McGurn had previously played in the youth teams at Queen's Park, under John McCormack. In his first season McGurn was second in line behind first-choice goalkeeper Craig Coyle. He spent all of the 2003–04 season on the substitutes bench.

He was the regular first-choice goalkeeper for Greenock Morton initially when Jim McInally replaced John McCormack as manager, when he also worked as the club's goalkeeping coach until David Wylie returned to the club. When Jim McInally took charge Craig Coyle was out injured and from there McGurn retained his place in the side until Jim McInally signed Paul Mathers.

He was released by Greenock Morton in May 2008 and signed for Scottish Second Division club Raith Rovers a few days later. On 29 April 2015, McGurn sign a new contract to stay at Raith Rovers for the next two years at least.

On 28 August 2015, McGurn agreed a season-long loan with Stranraer.

On 21 June 2016, McGurn signed for Cowdenbeath.

On 4 June 2019, McGurn signed for Raith Rovers, as a player-coach, on a part-time basis.

Outside of football
McGurn works as a lecturer at Cardonald College in sports coaching and fitness. He is also a Culture & Sport Glasgow activity coach, Glasgow football section coach and a qualified SFA goalkeeping coach. He is married to wife Alana, with whom he has a daughter.

Career statistics

Honours
Greenock Morton
Scottish Second Division: 2006–07

Raith Rovers
Scottish Second Division: 2008–09

References

External links

1980 births
Living people
Footballers from Glasgow
Scottish footballers
Association football goalkeepers
Queen's Park F.C. players
Greenock Morton F.C. players
Raith Rovers F.C. players
Stranraer F.C. players
Cowdenbeath F.C. players
Falkirk F.C. players
Scottish Football League players
Scottish Professional Football League players
Scottish sports coaches
Association football coaches
Raith Rovers F.C. non-playing staff
Greenock Morton F.C. non-playing staff